Goleman is a surname. Notable people with the surname include:

 Barbara Goleman, twentieth century American schoolteacher
 Daniel Goleman (born 1946), internationally known author, psychologist, science journalist, and corporate consultant

See also
 Goldman